Anbargah may refer to:
 Anbargah, Khuzestan
 Anbargah, Kohgiluyeh and Boyer-Ahmad